is a 3D eroge video game made by Illusion, released on April 21, 2006, in Japan. Compared to Illusion's previous games, the main story is shorter, it features an improved 3D engine and is mainly played through mouse control. The game centers on a male character who stalks and rapes a mother and her two daughters. Three years after its initial release, the game garnered international attention and controversy for its content, resulting in it being banned in several countries.

Gameplay
RapeLay is played from the perspective of a chikan named Masaya Kimura, who stalks and subsequently rapes the Kiryū family (a mother and her two daughters).

Plot
In Story Mode, the player controls a sex offender with a history of previous arrests. The protagonist sexually assaults two minors and an adult woman in the order of 12-year-old Manaka, 42-year-old Yūko, and 17-year-old Aoi. After the player finishes raping all three women, they unlock Free Play mode.

Aoi Kiryū catches Masaya Kimura groping a woman on a subway train, leading to his arrest by the authorities. The next morning, Aoi and her younger sister Manaka help their mother, Yūko, find a wallet she lost around their home while talking about Aoi's incident the previous day. Unknown to them, Kimura secretly eavesdrops on their conversation while waiting outside their house. It is revealed here that his father, a well-known influential politician, managed to release him from custody. When Kimura discovers that Yūko is widowed, he decides to exact revenge, starting with Manaka.

After following Manaka to the subway station, he gropes her on a train. Leaving the train at the next stop, he traps Manaka in a public bathroom, rapes her and takes photos of her naked, semen-covered body with his mobile phone. Masaya instructs Manaka to feign sickness and stay in her room the next day.

The following day, Masaya follows Yūko from her house to the subway before fondling her on a train. He then follows her to the city park. As instructed by Masaya, Manaka calls Yūko on her mobile phone, telling her that she is in the bushes at the park. When Yūko walks towards the bushes, Masaya ambushes her, ties her up, and rapes her. He takes photos as he did with Manaka previously, before handing her over to his gang of henchmen, who detain her for him.

On the third day, Masaya follows Aoi to the subway and shows her a picture of her tied-up mother. Shocked, she can only follow his orders as he gropes her on a train. After getting off the train, she asks Masaya the reasons for his actions, at which point she recognises him as the same man she reported for molesting a woman earlier. Getting in a vehicle, Masaya and his henchmen take Aoi to a hotel owned by his family. He violently rapes her in a mini-suite room and again photographs her after withdrawing.

After Masaya has had his way with Aoi, Yūko and Manaka are taken into the room via a secret door. With all three captured, Masaya reveals his plans to make them his sex slaves. Yūko tries to cover for her daughters and pleads with him to take her instead. He considers this and tells Yūko he might spare her daughters if she can prove her worth. Yūko gives him fellatio while her daughters watch. When Masaya seems pleased at her performance, Yūko thinks she has won her daughters' freedom. However, Masaya reveals that he will never change his mind and that they are all there to stay. Yūko breaks down in the end, Manaka breaks next and finally Aoi as well. The main story ends with an ominous title card stating that as a new day starts, the Kiryū family horror has just begun.

Endings 
There are two possible endings. Regardless of the ending achieved, it results in Masaya's death.

 Black Ending – Masaya impregnates either Manaka or Aoi or Yūko and decides to keep the child. A few days later, Masaya is at the subway when he falls onto the train tracks and is killed by a moving train.
 Red Ending – If the cowgirl position is used with Aoi before she breaks, the game will show a cutscene of Aoi brandishing a knife and stabbing Masaya many times while hysterically laughing. The scene goes black and Aoi's voice is heard. The game ends with Aoi being questioned by the police for Masaya's murder.

Characters
 – The player character of the game. A scion of an influential politician, Masaya becomes a chikan who stalks and subsequently rapes the Kiryū family after his release from prison. He lacks a voice actor, instead communicating exclusively through typed texts before and after rape game sessions.
 – the younger Kiryū sister at 12 years old. She has short black hair and wears a blue dress. The player can give her cat ears, which make her meow. Voiced by Natsumi Yanase (credited as "Izumi Maki").
 – the older Kiryū sister at 17 years old. She has long brunette hair and wears a school uniform. The player may choose to have her hair in a ponytail (default setting) or down and free-flowing. Voiced by Mao Enokizu.
 – the widowed mother of the two sisters. Yūko is a 42-year-old woman with short brown hair who wears a green top and a beige skirt. Yūko also has the largest breasts and the player can give her glasses to make her produce virgin/geek sound effects. Voiced by Akari Tomiyama (credited as "Kaori").

Controversy
Critics of violent imagery in video games, such as British Member of Parliament Keith Vaz, have cited games involving rape as an example of why video game content needs to be more strictly regulated. RapeLay in particular had come to Vaz's attention in 2009, three years after its initial release, as it was sold on Amazon.com, despite not being officially distributed nor supported outside of Japan, and he vowed to bring the issue into the British Parliament to prevent the game from being sold. Amazon subsequently removed the game from sale on its website. Equality Now urged activists to write to Illusion and then-Japanese Prime Minister Taro Aso in protest, arguing the game breaches Japan's obligations under the Convention on the Elimination of All Forms of Discrimination Against Women. In May 2009, these actions culminated in the restriction of the sale and production of RapeLay by the Ethics Organization of Computer Software (EOCS), an independent Japanese ratings organization for adult games, making it impossible to purchase the game even in Japan.

The distribution of RapeLay has been banned in Australia due to a campaign run by Women's Forum Australia, under the directorship of Melinda Tankard Reist. RapeLay is also the only video game to be effectively banned in Argentina. Citing RapeLay as an example, U.S. Supreme Court Justice Samuel Alito, in his concurring opinion vis-à-vis the case Brown v. Entertainment Merchants Association wrote, "It ... appears that there is no antisocial theme too base for some in the video-game industry to exploit."

Articles in defence have also been written, many noting that rape is considered a lesser crime than murder, yet there are thousands of legal video games in which the goal is to kill enemies. Illusion's response to the controversy was one of bewilderment and a reiteration that the game passed Japanese laws and was not sold outside Japan. Illusion later removed references to the game from their website and ceased distribution of the game, citing concerns over the impact on the industry.

As an immediate aftermath, several eroge publishers and studios began to ban foreigners from their official websites. Companies like Minori, Navel and VisualArts banned foreign IPs and chastised foreigners to move to Japan to play their games. In a controversial move, Minori also began to send cease and desist letters to translation groups and vandalized a translation wiki to enforce their ban. Users in the eroge community saw those acts as heavy-handed and xenophobic.

See also

 List of controversial video games
 Video game controversies

References

External links
 Official website

2006 video games
3D eroge
Censored video games
Censorship in Japan
Japan-exclusive video games
Video game controversies
Single-player video games
Video games developed in Japan
Windows games
Windows-only games
Obscenity controversies in video games
Sexual violence
Rape in fiction
Sexual abuse
Recalled publications
Product recalls
Video games with alternate endings
Child sexual abuse in fiction
Illusion (company) games